Goniurosaurus huuliensis is a gecko endemic to Vietnam.

References

Goniurosaurus
Reptiles of Vietnam
Reptiles described in 2008